Pecten is a genus of large scallops or saltwater clams, marine bivalve molluscs in the family Pectinidae, the scallops. This is the type genus of the family.

This genus is known in the fossil record from the Cretaceous period to the Quaternary period (age range: from 70.6 to 0.0 million years ago). Fossil shells within this genus have been found all over the world.

Etymology
The name Pecten is from the Latin word for a comb or rake. Since 1904, a Pecten shell has been used as the basis of the logo of Shell petroleum company.

Species
Species in the genus Pecten include:

P. albicans (Schröter, 1802) 
P. afribenedictus Kilburn & Dijkstra 1995
P. alcesianus † McLearn 1933
P. alpha † Dall 1898
P. argillensis † Conrad 1860
P. assinboiensis † Russell & Landes 1937
P. aurantiacus Roding 1798
P. aztecus † Bose 1906
P. barretti † Seeley 1861
P. bifidus † Menke 1843
P.biddleana †Kellum 1926
P. cadwalladerensis † McLearn 1942
P. ceibanus † Cooke 1928
P. coderensis † Harris 1927
P. collapsus † White 1887
P. coralliphila † Olsson 1922
P. danicus Chemnitz 1795
P. deformis † Tate 1887
P. dendyi † Hutton 1902
P. dentatus Sowerby 1829
P. disparatus † Wood 1882
P. elixatus † Conrad 1846
P. excavatus Anton, 1838
P. expansus † Smith 1847
P. flemingianus † de Koninck 1863
P. fumata † 
P. fumatus Reeve 1852
P. gramamensis † Maury 1930
P. grapteus † Maury 1924
P. hemphillii † Dall 1879
P. humphreysii † Conrad 1842
P. inaequalis † Cossmann & Lambert 1884
P. jacobaeus Linnaeus, 1758
P. kokcharofi † de Verneuil 1845
P. lowei Hertlein 1935
P. maximus Linnaeus, 1758
P. mclellani † Gibson 1987
P. mediacostatus † Hanna 1926
P. membranosus † Morton 1834
P. mendenhalli † Arnold 1906
P. nearchi † Vredenburg 1928
Pecten nigromagnus †   1897
P. novaezelandiae Reeve 1853
P. nugenti † Brown 1913
P. obsoletus Pennant 1777
P. palmipes † Tate 1886
P. paradezii † d'Orbigny 1842
P. pascoei † Cox 1936
P. pictus † Cossmann & Lambert 1884
P. pilgrimi † Cox 1936
P. plebeia † Lamarck 1806
P. politus † Gemmellaro 1896
P. pontiamnis † McLearn 1942
P. pseudosolarium † Hassan 1953
P. ptychotis † M'Coy 1847
P. raoulensis Powell 1958
P. sanctiludovici † Anderson & Martin 1914
P. santarosanus † Bose 1905
P. saskatchewanensis † Warren 1934
P. scintillatus † Conrad 1865
P. seabeensis † Richards 1947
P. sealyi † Richards 1947
P. sedanensis † Martin 1909
P. silentiensis † McLearn 1926
P. squamula † Lamarck 1806
P. striatus Müller 1776
P. subrufus Pennant 1777
P. sulcicostatus Sowerby II, 1842
P. suwanneensis † Dall 1898
P. thaumastus † Maury 1924
P. triradiatus Müller 1776
P. tyaughtonae † McLearn 1942
P. vasseli † Fuchs 1878
P. vaughani † Cooke 1919
P. vigintisulcatus † Müller 1776
P. wendelli † Tucker 1934
P. yessoensis Jay, 1857

References

Bibliography
Frank H.T. Rodes, Herbert S. Zim en Paul R. Shaffer (1993) - Natuurgids Fossielen (het ontstaan, prepareren en rangschikken van fossielen), Zuidnederlandse Uitgeverij N.V., Aartselaar. ISBN D-1993-0001-361
Cyril Walker & David Ward (1993) - Fossielen: Sesam Natuur Handboeken, Bosch & Keuning, Baarn. 

Pectinidae
Bivalve genera
Extant Cretaceous first appearances
Taxa named by Otto Friedrich Müller